Corey Scoffern (born May 20, 1975), better known by his stage name The Grouch, is an American rapper and producer. He is currently based in Maui, Hawaii, but grew up and spent most of his time in the San Francisco Bay Area (specifically Oakland, California). He is a founding member of Living Legends, an underground hip hop collective based in Los Angeles, California.

Life and career
The Grouch was born & raised in Oakland, California, where he attended Skyline High School.

He produced the entirety of Felt's debut album, Felt: A Tribute to Christina Ricci, in 2002.

He collaborated with Eligh, Evidence and Zion I on the song "Amp Live for President" in 2011.

Discography

Studio albums
 Don't Talk to Me (1995)
 Nothing Changes (1996)
 Success Is Destiny (1997)
 Fuck the Dumb (1998)
 Overall (1999) (with Luckyiam, as CMA)
 Making Perfect Sense (1999)
 G&E Music Volume 1 & 2 (2000) (with Eligh)
 They Don't Have This (2000)
 Crusader for Justice (2003)
 No More Greener Grasses (2003) (with Eligh)
 All Over (2004) (with Luckyiam, as CMA)
 Heroes in the City of Dope (2006) (with Zion I)
 Show You the World (2008)
 Three Eyes Off the Time (2009)
 Say G&E! (2009) (with Eligh)
 Heroes in the Healing of the Nation (2011) (with Zion I)
 The Tortoise and the Crow (2014) (with Eligh)
Unlock the Box (2018)
The Tonite Show with The Grouch (2018) (with DJ.Fresh)
Thees Handz (2019) (with Murs)
 What Would Love Do (2021) (with Eligh)

Compilation albums

 My Baddest Bitches (2005)
 Simple Man: Beans and Rice Sampler '07 (2007)

EPs
 G&E Music Volume 1 (1998) (with Eligh)
 G&E Music Volume 2 (2000) (with Eligh)
 Sound Advice (2004) (with Daddy Kev and D-Styles)
 The Winterfire EP (2014) (with Eligh and CunninLynguists)

Singles
 "You're Not the 1" (1998)
 "Simple Man" (1999)
 "Wish You a Good Day" (2000)
 "The Clap" (2003) (with Eligh)
 "No More Greener Grass" (2004) (with Eligh)
 "Windows" (2004) (with Luckyiam, as CMA)
 "Hit 'Em" (2006) (with Zion I)
 "Lift Me Up" (2007) (with Zion I)
 "Artsy" (2008)
 "All In" (2009) (with Eligh)
"Fish Fly" (2016) (with Kelli Love)
"I Love California Like You" (2016) (with Zion I and Eligh)
"Unconditional" (2018) (with Rio Amor)
"Devoted" (2018) (with DJ.Fresh)

DVDs
 Servin' Justice Directed by Peter D'Angelo Neil (2003)

Guest appearances
 Mystik Journeymen - "Billie & Me" from Walkman Invaders (1995)
 Murs - "Speed Bumps" from Comurshul (1996)
 Eligh - "The Dragon" from As They Pass (1996)
 Eligh - "Doghouse Bar" from A Story of 2 Worlds (1997)
 Murs - "Say Anything" from F'Real (1997)
 Scarub - "Love vs. Hate" from A Fact of the Matter (1999)
 Zion I - "Silly Puddy" from Mind over Matter (2000)
 Sunspot Jonz - "Loose Cannon" from Dirty Faces (2001)
 Zion I - "Flow" from Deep Water Slang V2.0 (2002)
 Mystik Journeymen - "Sweat" and "Mmmmmm" from Magic (2002)
 Luckyiam - "Unsatisfied" from Justify the Means (2002)
 DJ Drez - "Hallways & Doors" from The Capture of Sound (2003)
 Sunspot Jonz - "Unstoppable" from Don't Let Em Stop You (2003)
 Scarub - "You Know" from A New Perspective (2004)
 Fat Jack - "Without Love" from Cater to the DJ 2 (2004)
 Pigeon John - "Sleeping Giants" from Sings the Blues (2005)
 Edit - "Artsy Remix" and "Back Up Off the Floor Pt. 2" from Certified Air Raid Material (2008)
 Sunspot Jonz - "Ride the Rhythm" from Never Surrender (2008)
 BK-One with Benzilla - "Here I Am" from Rádio Do Canibal (2009)
 Bicasso - "The Town" from Rebel Musiq (2009)
 Eligh & Jo Wilkinson - "By and By" from On Sacred Ground (2009)
 Eligh - "Shine" from Grey Crow (2010)
 Amp Live - "Hot Right Now" from Murder at the Discotech (2010)
 Mystik Journeymen - "The Doorman Song" from Return 2 the Love (2010)
 Eligh & Amp Live - "Destination Unknown" from Therapy at 3 (2011)
 Lateef the Truthspeaker - "Oakland" from Firewire (2011)
 Headnodic - "Turn Your Radio Up" from Red Line Radio (2011)
 Bill Ortiz - "Winter in America" from Winter in America (2012)
 Casual - "Mama" from He Still Think He Raw (2012)
 Luckyiam - "Change This" from Time to Get Lucky (2012)
 Zion I - "We Don't" from Shadowboxing (2012)
 Qwel & Maker - "Pilfer" from Beautiful Raw (2013)
 Amp Live - "Last Wall" from Headphone Concerto (2014)
 Mr. Brady - "Time" from Timing Is Everything (2014)
 Abstract Rude - "Kan of Whoop Ass Reprise" from Keep the Feel: A Legacy of Hip Hop Soul (2015)
 Atmosphere -  "Fishing Blues" from Fishing Blues (2016)
 DJ Free Leonard - "Wise Words Spoken" from T.H.E.Y. EP (2018)
 Felt - "Hologram" from "Felt 4 U" (2020)

Productions
 Felt - Felt: A Tribute to Christina Ricci (2002)

References

Further reading

External links
 
 
 

1975 births
Living people
Underground rappers
Rappers from Oakland, California
Rappers from Los Angeles
American hip hop record producers
21st-century American rappers
Record producers from California